Phosphuga is a European genus of carrion beetle, whose sole member is the species Phosphuga atrata. The beetle is up to 15mm long and has an elongated neck that it uses to reach into snail shells, which it sprays with a digestive fluid. The beetle feeds on live snails, insects and earthworms, as well as on carrion. Newly moulted beetles are brownish in color, older ones are black. The larvae are black and flattened and feed on snails as well. They pupate in the ground. Adults are flightless, lacking flight muscles.

Although they are widely distributed, they are seldom found, because they hunt at night and hide during the day, often under bark. When disturbed, they excrete a yellow fluid and retract their head under the shield.

Range: Europe (including UK), Russia (European, Siberia, Far East, Kuriles), Turkey, Armenia, Azerbaijan, Georgia, Iran, Afghanistan, Kyrgyzstan, Kazakhstan, Tajikistan, Turkmenistan, Uzbekistan, Mongolia, Korea (N,S), Japan, India (Kashmir), China (Heilongjiang+); intro Iceland

External links
 
 
 Pictures of adult and larva
  UK Beetles Phosphuga atrata Linnaeus, 1758

References

Silphidae
Monotypic beetle genera